Andropolis may refer to:

 Places and jurisdictions 
 Andropolis, Egypt, an Ancient city and former bishopric, now Kherbeta and a Latin Catholic titular see 
 a fictitious (SF) metropolis in The Year 3,000

 A Greek family name; bearers include, also in fiction
 Greek character Constantine Andropolis in Journey to Atlantis (novel)
 Olympics hopeful Michael Andropolis in Running (film) 
 Nick Andropoulos, a character on List of As the World Turns characters, played by Michael Forest